Cacerense Esporte Clube, usually known simply as Cacerense is a Brazilian football club from Cáceres, Mato Grosso state.

History
On 10 June 1996, Cacerense Esporte Clube was founded.

In 2006, the club won its first title, which was the Governor of Mato Grosso Cup, beating Vila Aurora in the final, and thus being allowed to compete in the following year's Brazilian Championship Third Level.

In 2007, Cacerense won its second title, the Mato Grosso State Championship finishing ahead of Jaciara In the same year, the club competed in the Brazilian Championship Third Level.

Achievements
 Campeonato Matogrossense:
 Winners (1): 2007
 Copa Governador do Mato Grosso:
 Winners (1): 2006

References

Association football clubs established in 1996
Football clubs in Mato Grosso
1996 establishments in Brazil